William Power Keating Trench, 1st Earl of Clancarty (23 June 1741 – 27 April 1805) was an Irish aristocrat and politician and later United Kingdom statesman at the time of the Act of Union. His family, through his son Richard, became prominent and hereditary members of the Netherlands' nobility.

Early life
Trench was born on 23 June 1741. He was one of six sons and five daughters born to Frances ( Power) Trench and Richard Trench. Among his siblings were Gen. Eyre Power Trench (who married Charlotte, widow of Lady Sir John Burgoyne, 7th Baronet and daughter of James Johnston), Nicholas Power Trench (who married Jane Butler, daughter of Sir Richard Butler, 5th Baronet), and Anne Power Trench (wife of Charles Cobbe, MP, son of Thomas Cobbe and grandson of Charles Cobbe, Archbishop of Dublin).

His paternal grandparents were Elizabeth ( Eyre) Trench and Frederick Trench, who represented Banagher and Galway County in the Irish House of Commons. His maternal grandparents were David Power and Elizabeth ( Keating) Power.

Career
William was a Member of Parliament in the Irish House of Commons, and supported the Whigs. He represented Galway County from 1768 until 1797 and served as High Sheriff of County Kilkenny in 1777.

He was advanced to the Irish House of Lords as Baron Kilconnel (created 25November 1797), and to the position of Viscount Dunlo (created 3January 1801) as a reward for his continuing support of the Whig Party. On 12February 1803 he became Earl of Clancarty. His choice of the title is derived from his descent from Elena MacCarty, wife of John Power, daughter of Cormac Oge MacCarty, Viscount Muskerry, and sister of Donough MacCarty, 1st Earl of Clancarty. He therefore became the first Earl of Clancarty in its second creation.

Personal life
On 30 October 1762, Trench married Anne Gardiner, daughter of Florinda ( Norman) Gardiner and Charles Gardiner of Dublin, MP for Taghmon. Anne's brother was Luke Gardiner, 1st Viscount Mountjoy. The Trench family seat was at Garbally in Ballinasloe. William and Anne had nineteen children:

 Frances Trench (1765–1768), who died young.
 Anne Trench (1766–1833), who married William Gregory of Coole.
 Lady Florinda Trench (1766–1851), who married William Handcock, 1st Viscount Castlemaine.
 Francis Trench (1767–1805), who died unmarried.
 Charles Trench (1767–1770), who died young.
 Richard Le Poer Trench, 2nd Earl of Clancarty (1767–1837), who married Henrietta Margaret Staples.
 Power Le Poer Trench (1770–1839), the Archbishop of Tuam who married Anne Taylor.
 William Le Poer Trench (1771–1846), a Rear Admiral who married Sarah Cuppage and, after her death, Margaret Downing.
 Charles Le Poer Trench (1772–1839), the Archdeacon of Ardagh who married Frances Elwood.
 Thomas Le Poer Trench (1774–1795), who died unmarried.
 Luke Henry Le Poer Trench (1775–1798), who died unmarried.
 Louisa Trench (1776–1785), who died young.
 Frederick Trench (1778–1800), who died unmarried.
 Robert Le Poer Trench (1782–1823), a Colonel who married Letitia Susanna Dillon, a daughter of Robert Dillon, 1st Baron Clonbrock.
 Lady Elizabeth Trench (1784–1877), who married John McClintock of Drumcar.
 Lady Harriet Trench (1785–1855), who married Sir Daniel Toler Osborne, 12th Baronet.
 Lady Frances Mary Trench (1787–1843), who married Henry Stanley Monck, 1st Earl of Rathdowne.
 Lady Louisa Trench (1789–1852), who died unmarried.
 Lady Emily Trench (1790–1816), who married Robert La Touche of Harristown.

Lord Clancarty died on 27 April 1805 at Ballinasloe, Ireland. He was succeeded in his titles by his son, Richard.

Ancestry

References

External links

Stirnet: Trench01 (subscription required to view without interrupton)
Stirnet: Trench01 (subscription required to view without interruption)
Stirnet: Eyre02 (subscription required to view without interruption)

1741 births
1805 deaths
People from Ballinasloe
Politicians from County Galway
19th-century Irish people
Peers of Ireland created by George III
Irish MPs 1761–1768
Irish MPs 1769–1776
Irish MPs 1776–1783
Irish MPs 1783–1790
Irish MPs 1790–1797
Members of the Parliament of Ireland (pre-1801) for County Galway constituencies
High Sheriffs of County Kilkenny
William
Earls of Clancarty